Martha Scanlan is an old-time, traditional music singer-songwriter. She is originally from Minnesota and has been featured on the Woodsongs Old-Time Radio Hour, NPR's World Cafe Next, and Mountain Stage, as well as the Cold Mountain soundtrack (as a member of the Reeltime Travelers). In 2002, she won the Chris Austin songwriting contest at the music festival Merlefest.

References

External links
 Martha Scanlan official artist site
 PopMatters review

Living people
Old-time musicians
Year of birth missing (living people)